Nokugcina Elsie Mhlophe (born 24 October 1958), also known as Gcina Mhlophe, is a South African anti-apartheid activist, actress, storyteller, poet, playwright, director and author.

Storytelling is a deeply traditional activity in South Africa, and Mhlophe is one of the few woman storytellers in a country dominated by males. She does her work through charismatic performances, working to preserve storytelling as a means of keeping history alive and encouraging South African children to read. She tells her stories in four of South Africa's languages: English, Afrikaans, Zulu and Xhosa.

Life and career
Gcina Mhlope was born in 1958 in KwaZulu-Natal to a Xhosa mother and a Zulu father. She started her working life as a domestic worker, later working as a newsreader at the Press Trust and BBC Radio, then as a writer for Learn and Teach, a magazine for newly-literate people.

She began to get a sense of the demand for stories while in Chicago in 1988. She performed at a library in a mostly-black neighbourhood, where an ever-growing audience kept inviting her back. Still, Mhlophe only began to think of storytelling as a career after meeting an Imbongi, one of the legendary poets of African folklore, and after encouragement by Mannie Manim, the then-director of the Market Theatre, Johannesburg.

Since then Mhlophe has appeared in theatres from Soweto to London and much of her work has been translated into German, French, Italian, Swahili and Japanese. Mhlophe has travelled extensively in Africa and other parts of the world giving storytelling workshops.

Mhlophe's stories meld folklore, information, current affairs, song and idiom. The realisation of her dreams is a visceral motivator for her and she is passing on her infectious enthusiasm by developing young talent to carry forward the work of storytelling through the Zanendaba (Bring me a story) Initiative. This initiative, established in 2002, is a collaboration with the Market Theatre and READ, a national literacy organization.

Mhlophe currently serves as the patron of the ASSITEJ South Africa, the International Association for Theatre for Children and Young People.

Mhlophe currently serves as the patron of ASSITEJ South Africa, the International Association for Theatre for Children and Young People.

Selected works
 1983, took the lead in Umongikazi: The Nurse, by Maishe Maponya
 1984, in Black Dog: Inj'emnyama
 1986, Place of Weeping (film)
 1986, Have You Seen Zandile? (autobiographical play, at the Market Theatre, Johannesburg , Mhlophe as Zandile)
 1987, Born in the RSA (New York)
 1989, storytelling festival at the Market Theatre
 1989, performed a poem in honour of Albert Luthuli, 1960 Nobel Peace Prize winner
 1990, performed Have You Seen Zandile? at the Edinburgh Festival tour through Europe and the USA
 1989–1990, resident director at the Market Theatre
 co-ordinator at READ, a national literacy organization
 1991, Ashoka Fellowship (social entrepreneurship innovator)
 1993, Music for Little People (CD)
 1993, reader voice Not so fast, Songololo (videorecording), Weston Woods, Weston CT, Scholastic  
 1994, The Gift of the Tortoise (contributed to the Ladysmith Black Mambazo album)
 1997, Poetry Africa, presenting poet
 1999, guest speaker at the Perth Writers Festival
 London Philharmonic Orchestra 
 Royal Albert Hall, London
 Cologne Philharmonie, Africa at the Opera
 2000, performed in Peter und der Wolf at the Komische Oper (Berlin)
 Wrote music for her SABC TV series Gcina & Friends
 2002, Fudukazi's Magic screened in Durban at the African Union Film Festival
 2002, The Bones of Memory (performance, history-telling from the old and new South Africa)
 2003, lectured on storytelling at the Eye of the Beholder seminar
 2003, Mata Mata (performance, family musical)
 2006, FIFA World Cup South African handover ceremony, Germany

Recognition
1999, Honorary doctorate from the Open University, UK
1999, Honorary doctorate from the University of Natal
 2014, Honorary doctorate from Rhodes University

Collaborations
 Pops Mohamed, musician and tribal music preservationist
 Ladysmith Black Mambazo, choir group, The Gift of the Tortoise (CD), 1994 and Music for Little People in America (CD), 1993
 Bheki Khoza, guitarist, Animated Tales of the World (TV series for Right Angle in the UK and for the SABC)
 Anant Singh, video producer, Fudukazi's Magic (CD and video for German audiences)
 Biblionef South Africa, a children's book donation agency, supplies book packages for Mhlophe's workshops, 2003

Documentary appearances
 Acted and narrated in  Travelling Songs
 1990, performed poetry in Songololo: Voices of Change  (how aspects of culture in South Africa have become part of the anti-apartheid struggle)
 1993, The Travelling Song (the contemporary process of story gathering)
 Appeared in  Literacy Alive
 Appeared in Art Works

Awards
 Nominee for the  Noma Award  for Queen of the Tortoises, 1991
 Book Chat Award for Molo Zoleka
 OBIE Theatrical Award (New York) for Born in the RSA 
 Fringe First Award (Edinburgh) for Have you seen Zandile?
 Joseph Jefferson Award for Best Actress (Chicago) for Have you seen Zandile?
 Sony Award for Radio Drama from BBC Radio Africa for Have you seen Zandile?
 In 2016 she was chosen as one of BBC's 100 Women

Bibliography
 Mhlophe, Gcina. The Toilet 1987 (Short Story)
 Mhlophe, Gcina. Molo Zoleka New Africa Education, 1994. (Children's book)
 MaZanendaba (Children's book)
 Mhlophe, Gcina. The Snake with Seven Heads. Johannesburg, Skotaville Publishers, 1989. (Children's book, translated into five African languages, the English edition is required in all South African school libraries)
 Mhlophe, Gcina. Have you seen Zandile?. Portsmouth, NH: Heinemann, 1990. (Play, based on her childhood, required in South African university libraries)
 Mhlophe, Gcina. Queen of the Tortoises. Johannesburg: Skotaville, 1990. (Children's book)
 Mhlophe, Gcina. The Singing Dog. Illustrated by Erica Maritz and Andries Maritz. Johannesburg: Skotaville, 1992. (Children's book)
 Mhlophe, Gcina. Nalohima, the Deaf Tortoise. Gamsbek, 1999.
 Mhlophe, Gcina. Fudukazi's Magic. Cambridge: Cambridge University Press, 1999. (CD – lyrics and music, performance)
 Mhlophe, Gcina.  Fudukazi's Magic. Cambridge University Press, 2000 (CD – lyrics and music, performance, for German audiences)
 Mhlophe, Gcina.  Nozincwadi,  Mother of Books. Maskew Miller Longman, 2001. (CD and book, South African roadshow to rural schools)
 Mhlophe, Gcina. African Mother of Christmas. Maskew Miller Longman, 2002. (CD and book)
 Mhlophe, Gcina. Love Child. Durban: University of Natal Press, 2002.  (Memoir, collection of stories)
 Margaret Daymond et al. (eds). Women Writing Africa: the southern region. Johannesburg: Witwatersrand University Press, 2002.
 Mhlophe, Gcina. Stories of Africa. University of Natal Press, 2003. (Children's book)
 Mhlophe, Gcina. Queen of Imbira. Maskew Miller Longman. (Children's book)
 Mhlophe, Gcina  Songs & stories of Africa – South African Music Awards Winner 2010 for Best English Kids Album – African Cream Music

See also
 List of African writers
 Famous South African people
 Poetry Africa

References

External links

The Connection. org Dick Gordon of WBUR Boston interviews Mhlophe extensively.
Biblionef South Africa Official site of Biblionef South Africa, a children's book donation organisation which has previously collaborated with Mhlophe.
 Badilisha Poetry Exchange Profile and podcast

1959 births
Living people
South African women poets
Women storytellers
South African dramatists and playwrights
Women dramatists and playwrights
20th-century South African poets
20th-century women writers
BBC 100 Women
South African actresses
Anti-apartheid activists